Mrtvo morje is a novel by Slovenian author Beno Zupančič. It was first published in 1956.

See also
List of Slovenian novels

Slovenian novels
1956 novels